Bangalaia nebulosa is a species of beetle in the family Cerambycidae. It was described by Quedenfeldt in 1887, originally under the genus Anoplostetha. It is known from the Ivory Coast, the Central African Republic, Guinea, the Democratic Republic of the Congo, Equatorial Guinea, Angola, Gabon, Senegal, Cameroon, and Uganda.

References

Prosopocerini
Beetles described in 1887